Taylor Greene or Taylor Green may refer to:

 Christina Taylor Green (born 2001), a victim of the 2011 Tucson shooting
 Taylor Green (born 1986), Canadian baseball player
 Marjorie Taylor Greene (born 1974), an American politician

See also
 Taylor–Green vortex